Goran Ivanišević and Ivan Ljubičić were the defending champions but Ljubičić chose not to compete this year. Ivanišević played alongside Thomas Enqvist, but they were eliminated in the round robin.

Greg Rusedski and Fabrice Santoro defeated Jonas Björkman and Thomas Johansson in the final, 7–5, 6–1 to win the gentlemen's invitation doubles tennis title at the 2016 Wimbledon Championships.

Draw

Final

Group A
Standings are determined by: 1. number of wins; 2. number of matches; 3. in two-players-ties, head-to-head records; 4. in three-players-ties, percentage of sets won, or of games won; 5. steering-committee decision.

Group B
Standings are determined by: 1. number of wins; 2. number of matches; 3. in two-players-ties, head-to-head records; 4. in three-players-ties, percentage of sets won, or of games won; 5. steering-committee decision.

References
Gentlemen's Invitation Doubles

Men's Invitation Doubles